Love and Death is a 1975 film by Woody Allen.

Love and Death may also refer to:

Love and Death (band), an American metal band
Love & Death (EP), an EP by Sentenced
Love and Death (miniseries), an HBO mini-series
Love and Death (novel), a novel based on US TV series Angel
Love and Death: The Murder of Kurt Cobain, a 2004 book by Ian Halperin and Max Wallace

See also 
A Walk with Love and Death, a film
A Walk with Love & Death, an album